Maurice James Handford (29 April 1928 – 16 December 1986) was a British horn player and conductor.

Handford was born in Salisbury. He was principal horn of the Hallé Orchestra 1949–61, then associate conductor 1966–71, and staff conductor.  He died in Warminster.

The following article was published in The Daily Telegraph on 17 December 1986, shortly after his death:

"Maurice Handford who has died aged 58, was a conductor with a wide range in repertoire. Although he was perhaps not a familiar figure to concert goers on the South Bank, he was well known to audiences in the rest of the country and from 1971 to 1975 was principal conductor of the Calgary Symphony Orchestra.

Born in Salisbury, he studied at the Royal Academy of Music. He was a horn player and for 12 years, from 1949 to 1961, he was principal Horn in Barbirolli's Hallé. Although he did not have a big tone, he had a natural feeling for tone colour and was unfailingly accurate, one rarely heard a 'fluff' in any of his orchestral solos.

He had ambitions to be a conductor and was assisted by the patronage of ICI (Blackley), which invited him to conduct the works orchestra and, in May 1960, sponsored a Hallé concert in Manchester at which he conducted Berlioz’s Symphony Fantastique. He was also helped by Barbirolli, who invited him to conduct some Hallé industrial concerts.

By 1962 he was sufficiently launched to be given charge of the first Hallé performance of Orff’s Carmina Burana. Soon he was conducting works of the size of Strauss’s Also sprach Zarathustra and Shostakovich's 12th symphony.

Barbirolli concert.

Through the rest of the 1960s, until Barbirolli’s death in 1970, Handford conducted most of the adventurous works in the Hallé repertoire and in 1963 was appointed Associate Conductor, at first jointly with Lawrence Leonard, but after 1966 on his own. Sir John trusted him enough to let him conduct Elgar and Vaughan Williams symphonies in which he himself excelled, but Handford never followed his mentor into Mahler and Bruckner. He was responsible for performances of Messiaen’s Turangalila Symphony, Schoenberg's Erwartung and for introducing to Manchester the music of Lutoslawski and Penderecki.

But no assignment was more difficult than in September, 1970 when he conducted Elgar's Dream of the Gerontius in memory of Barbirolli, a performance that rose both musically and emotionally to the occasion. Handford had every expectation that the Hallé conductorship would then be his.

He was bitterly resentful when he was passed over and in 1971 he resigned as Associate Conductor, the Hallé management had probably reasoned that he had not at that time had sufficient experience with other orchestras and that he was not a “personality” as far as audiences were concerned.

Nevertheless, it was still to Handford that the Hallé turned when a Bruno Maderna concert had to be undertaken at short notice or when Elgar’s The Apostles and Delius’s Mass of Life needed revival, or a concert version of Porgy and Bess was planned. He was by now in demand with other orchestras, such as the BBC Northern and Welsh, the CBSO and the Ulster, where his willingness to take on the unfamiliar was appreciated.

Unobtrusive style

He was for a time a conductor of the Liverpool Welsh Choral Union and until 1972 conducted the annual opera and choral performances of the Northern School of Music, Manchester. His virtues as a trainer of students were also recognised by the Royal Academy of Music, where he conducted several remarkable performances.

Although the compilers of ‘New Grove’ did not consider him worthy of inclusion and record companies virtually ignored him, Handford's unobtrusive style and his ability to get to the heart of a score were appreciated by musicians. He was not the flamboyant maestro and this may have held back his career in quarters where flashier talents are admired. But those who heard his finest Elgar performances and his lucid readings of complex contemporary works will know that music making in this country is much the poorer for his premature and lamented death."

References

External links
 National Portrait Gallery

1928 births
1986 deaths
British male conductors (music)
20th-century British conductors (music)
20th-century British male musicians